The United Nations Educational, Scientific and Cultural Organization (UNESCO) World Heritage Sites are places of importance to cultural or natural heritage as described in the UNESCO World Heritage Convention, established in 1972. Cultural heritage consists of monuments (such as architectural works, monumental sculptures, or inscriptions), groups of buildings, and sites (including archaeological sites). Natural features (consisting of physical and biological formations), geological and physiographical formations (including habitats of threatened species of animals and plants), and natural sites which are important from the point of view of science, conservation or natural beauty, are defined as natural heritage. The Kingdom of Sweden accepted the convention on 22 January 1985, making its historical sites eligible for inclusion on the list.

As of 2020, there are fifteen World Heritage Sites in Sweden, including thirteen cultural sites, one natural site and one mixed site. The first Swedish site added to the list was the Royal Domain of Drottningholm, inscribed at the 15th session of the World Heritage Committee, held in Carthage, Tunisia, in 1991. The most recent site added to the current list is the Decorated Farmhouses of Hälsingland, inscribed in 2012.

There are two transnational sites. The High Coast / Kvarken Archipelago is shared with Finland, while the Struve Geodetic Arc is shared with nine other countries. , Sweden also has one site on the tentative list.



World Heritage Sites 
UNESCO lists sites under ten criteria; each entry must meet at least one of the criteria. Criteria i through vi are cultural, and vii through x are natural.

Tentative sites
In addition to sites inscribed on the World Heritage List, member states can maintain a list of tentative sites that they may consider for nomination. Nominations for the World Heritage List are only accepted if the site was previously listed on the tentative list. As of 2020, Sweden recorded one site on its tentative list.

See also
 Tourism in Sweden
 List of national parks of Sweden

References

External links
 The Swedish National Commission for UNESCO

Sweden
 
World Heritage Sites